Saint Peter was one of the original Christian apostles and first Pope of the Catholic Church, although there are many other saints named Peter.

Saint Peter may also refer to:

 Saint Peter, Barbados, parish in the Caribbean island country of Barbados
 Saint Peter, Indiana,  unincorporated community in Highland Township, Franklin County, Indiana
 Saint Peter, U.S. Virgin Islands, settlement on the island of Saint Croix in the United States Virgin Islands
 Saint Peter Port, town and one of parishes on the island of Guernsey in the Channel Islands
 Saint Peter and Saint Paul Archipelago, group of 15 small islets and rocks in the central equatorial Atlantic Ocean
 Saint Peter's Peacocks, team representing Saint Peter's University, Jersey City, New Jersey
 Saint Peter's University, private Jesuit university in Jersey City, New Jersey
 Mary of Saint Peter (1816–1848), Discalced Carmelite nun who lived in Tours, France
 Mount Saint Peter, northern part of a plateau in the Netherlands
 Saint Peters, community located in Chester County, Pennsylvania, United States of America

Art 
 Saint Peter (Brunelleschi), sculpture attributed to Filippo Brunelleschi
 Saint Peter, canvas painting by El Greco
 Saint Peter (Grão Vasco), painting by Portuguese artist Grão Vasco
 "Saint Peter" (poem), a poem by Henry Lawson
 Saint Peter's tomb, site under St. Peter's Basilica that includes several graves
 Church of Saint Peter, church near Antakya (Antioch), Turkey

See also 

 St. Peter (disambiguation)
 Saint Peter Parish (disambiguation)
 Cathedral of Saint Peter (disambiguation)
 Saint Peter Island (disambiguation)
 Church of Saint Peter (disambiguation)